"¿Adónde Se Fue?", or simply "Adónde Se Fue" (English: "Where Did It Go")is a song by American duo Xtreme. It served as the second single for their second album, Haciendo Historia (2006). An R&B Version, which is listed as an R&B/Pop Version, is also featured in the album. A Pop Version was included in the Platinum Edition of the album replacing the R&B Version.

Track listing
CD single
 "¿Adónde Se Fue?" (Bachata Version) - 3:05
 "¿Adónde Se Fue?" (Pop Version)" - 3:07

Charts

References

2006 songs
2007 singles
Xtreme (group) songs